20th Century Masters – The Christmas Collection: The Best of George Strait is a collection of some of George Strait's greatest Christmas songs. It was released on September 23, 2003, by MCA Nashville.

Track listing

Critical reception

20th Century Masters – The Christmas Collection: The Best of George Strait received three out of five stars from William Ruhlmann of Allmusic. In his review, Ruhlmann laments that "this compilation is not what it might have been" because "Strait seems intent on rewarding his current crop of contributing songwriters by including plenty of their mediocre contributions to the Christmas repertoire."

Chart positions
20th Century Masters – The Christmas Collection: The Best of George Strait peaked at number 60 on the U.S. Billboard Top Country Albums chart.

References

Albums produced by Jimmy Bowen
Albums produced by Tony Brown (record producer)
Strait, George
2003 greatest hits albums
2003 Christmas albums
Christmas albums by American artists
Christmas compilation albums
George Strait compilation albums
MCA Records compilation albums
Country Christmas albums